Nimbhore is a village in the Karmala taluka of Solapur district in Maharashtra state, India.

Demographics
Covering  and comprising 679 households at the time of the 2011 census of India, Nimbhore had a population of 3144. There were 1660 males and 1484 females, with 404 people being aged six or younger.

References

Villages in Karmala taluka